Ronny van Es (born 22 May 1978 in Velsen, Netherlands) is a Dutch retired footballer.

Club career
After his Portuguese adventure Van Es returned to his former club Stormvogels Telstar in 2004/2005. He went on a new foreign adventure in July 2007, when he signed a one-year contract at Greek second tier club Panthrakikos with an option for another year. He made a good 2007–08 season helping his Greek club to promote. Despite the successes, he signed a new 2-year contract at Cypriot side AEP Paphos until 2010. On January 10, 2009 however he signed a contract and moved to Greek outfit Doxa Drama. He left after a half year Doxa Dramas of Greece and signed in the Netherlands with Topklasse team AFC.

Player agent
He retired in 2013 to become a player agent, representing doping suspect Kevin van Essen among others.

References

1978 births
Living people
People from Velsen
Association football forwards
Dutch footballers
SC Telstar players
HFC Haarlem players
Rio Ave F.C. players
F.C. Maia players
Panthrakikos F.C. players
AEP Paphos FC players
Doxa Drama F.C. players
Amsterdamsche FC players
Eerste Divisie players
Derde Divisie players
Primeira Liga players
Football League (Greece) players
Cypriot First Division players
Dutch expatriate footballers
Expatriate footballers in Portugal
Dutch expatriate sportspeople in Portugal
Expatriate footballers in Greece
Dutch expatriate sportspeople in Greece
Dutch sports agents
Association football agents
Expatriate footballers in Cyprus
Dutch expatriate sportspeople in Cyprus
Footballers from North Holland